Delbert Oakley "Del" (or "Butch") Bates Jr. (June 12, 1940 – September 24, 2009), was an American professional baseball catcher, who played in Major League Baseball (MLB) for the Philadelphia Phillies, in . In 22 career games, he had 8 hits, in 60 at-bats. Bates batted left-handed and threw right-handed.

Bates was born in Kirkland, Washington, in 1940. After graduating from Bothell High School, he served four years in the U.S. Navy, as a submariner, stationed in Honolulu, Hawaii. After being discharged, Bates was signed by the Los Angeles Angels, as an amateur free agent, in 1963.

After retiring from baseball, Bates was a longshoreman at the Port of Seattle. He was active in the International Longshore Union, Local 19, until retiring, in 2004. Bates died on September 24, 2009.

External links

Del Bates at The Deadball Era

Del Bates Seattle Times Obituary from Legacy.com

1940 births
2009 deaths
Philadelphia Phillies players
Eugene Emeralds players
Richmond Braves players
Major League Baseball catchers
Sportspeople from Kirkland, Washington
Baseball players from Washington (state)
Arizona Instructional League Angels players
Columbus Jets players
Dallas–Fort Worth Spurs players
Rochester Red Wings players
Tri-City Angels players
Wichita Aeros players